Rosemarie "Rosi" Ackermann (born 4 April 1952) is a German former high jumper. On 26 August 1977 in Berlin, she became the first female high jumper to clear a height of 2 metres.

Biography
She was born in Lohsa, Saxony. As Rosemarie Witschas, she represented East Germany in the 1972 Summer Olympics in Munich, finishing seventh behind Ulrike Meyfarth.

In 1974, at the European Championships in Rome, she won her first international title, setting a new world record of 1.95m. Later that year, she married handball player Manfred Ackermann, and assumed his surname. Two years later, when she won the gold medal at the 1976 Summer Olympics held in Montreal, Canada.

In 1978, she lost her European title to Italian jumper Sara Simeoni.  Ackermann retired from athletics after the 1980 Olympics, at which she placed fourth, just outside the medals.

Ackermann is the last female high jumper to set a world record using the straddle technique. She is also the last high jumper of either gender to win an Olympic gold medal in the high jump with that technique.

Competing for the sports club SC Cottbus, Ackerman was East German high jump champion in 1973, 1974, 1976, 1977, 1979 and 1980, and also won bronze medals in 1969 and 1972. She was the East German indoor champion in 1973, 1975, 1976, 1977 and 1980.

See also
 Female two metres club

References

External links
 

1952 births
Living people
People from Bautzen (district)
East German female high jumpers
Olympic athletes of East Germany
Olympic gold medalists for East Germany
Athletes (track and field) at the 1972 Summer Olympics
Athletes (track and field) at the 1976 Summer Olympics
Athletes (track and field) at the 1980 Summer Olympics
World record setters in athletics (track and field)
East German sportspeople in doping cases
European Athletics Championships medalists
Medalists at the 1976 Summer Olympics
Olympic gold medalists in athletics (track and field)
Recipients of the Patriotic Order of Merit in gold
Track & Field News Athlete of the Year winners
Sportspeople from Saxony